Ágnes Kozáry (born 28 September 1966 in Zalaegerszeg) is a retired Hungarian sprinter who competed primarily in the 200 metres. She represented her country at the 1992 Summer Olympics as well as one outdoor and one indoor World Championships.

International competitions

Personal bests
Outdoor
100 metres – 11.66 (+2.0 m/s, Budapest 1989)
200 metres – 23.37 (Zalaegerszeg 1989)
400 metres – 53.06 (Nyíregyháza 1989)
Indoor
200 metres – 24.04 (Budapest 1989)
400 metres – 56.01 (Budapest 1988)

References

All-Athletics profile

1966 births
Living people
Hungarian female sprinters
Athletes (track and field) at the 1992 Summer Olympics
Olympic athletes of Hungary
World Athletics Championships athletes for Hungary
People from Zalaegerszeg
Olympic female sprinters
Sportspeople from Zala County